"You're Never Too Old for Young Love" is a song written by Frank J. Myers and Rick Giles, and recorded by American country music artist Eddy Raven. It was released in March 1987 as the third single from the album Right Hand Man.  The song reached #3 on the Billboard Hot Country Singles & Tracks chart.

Chart performance

References

1987 singles
1986 songs
Eddy Raven songs
Songs written by Frank J. Myers
RCA Records singles
Songs written by Rick Giles